"Be Blessed" is a song by American singer Yolanda Adams, a single from her 2005 album "Day By Day". The song topped the Gospel Billboard chart making it one of the most successful Gospel songs of 2005.

Awards

At the 2006 Grammy Awards, Adams won Best Gospel Song for this song. That same year, it was also nominated for a Dove Award for Contemporary Gospel Recorded Song of the Year at the 37th GMA Dove Awards.

References

2005 singles
Songs written by Jimmy Jam and Terry Lewis
Yolanda Adams songs
Song recordings produced by Jimmy Jam and Terry Lewis
2005 songs
Songs written by Yolanda Adams